Viva La Banda is the 11th album by Mexican iconic pop singer Verónica Castro. It was released in 1990. "Caray" is a song by Juan Gabriel.

Track listing
 "Salud Dinero Y amor" (Rodolfo Sciamarella)
 "Porurri" El Gallo Tuerto/ Mi Cafetal/ Cachita (Jose Barrios)
 "Caray" (Juan Gabriel)
 "Ni Porfavor (Si No Me Quieres Ni Modo)" 
 "Amor Chiquito"  
 "La Banda Dominguera"
 "Porurri" Nana Pancha/ Yo Soy Quien Soy (Pichirilo -R. Ruiz)
 "Esta Noche La Paso Contigo" 
 "Papalote / Copa Tras Copa"

Singles

1990 albums
Verónica Castro albums